This is a list of mayors (Stadtpräsident) of Lucerne, Switzerland.

Lucerne
Lucerne
 
Lists of mayors (complete 1900-2013)